Hypercallia heliomima is a moth in the family Depressariidae. It was described by Edward Meyrick in 1930. It is found in Colombia.

The wingspan is about 24 mm. The forewings are orange with the markings deep fuscous purple. There is an elongate-triangular blotch on the base of the costa (the apex anterior), and a median streak from the base to one-fourth, as well as a hemispherical blotch on the costa beyond one-third, four inwards-oblique transverse blotches between this and the apex, one at the apex, and five from the termen, the last small, the tornal, costal and upper part of the terminal margin between these rather narrowly suffused white. There are nine small cloudy spots: one (or two) towards the dorsum about one-fourth, two elongate almost dorsal posteriorly, five arranged in a circle in the disc, and one larger beyond these towards the apex. The hindwings are orange with a narrow purplish-fuscous terminal streak, cut by orange lines on the veins.

References

Moths described in 1930
Hypercallia